Sar Jangal is a village in Pasakuh Rural District, Zavin District, Kalat County, Razavi Khorasan Province, Iran. At the 2006 census, its population was 240, in 54 families.

References 

Populated places in Kalat County